Kanahaud Landscape Conservation Area is a nature park in Tartu County, Estonia.

Its area is 5 ha.

The protected area was designated in 1964 to protect Kanahaua Hollow (:et) and its surrounding areas. In 2015, the protected area was redesigned to the landscape conservation area.

References

Nature reserves in Estonia
Geography of Tartu County